Vivek Kar is an Indian bollywood film music director score composer and producer.

Career 
Working as a music composer, Kar made his debut as a film composer in Bollywood in the film Zindagi 50-50 where he composed four original songs.

Kar composed the songs for the film Meeruthiya Gangsters in 2015, One Night Stand in 2016, Gun & Goal in 2015, Care of Footpath 2 in 2015, Saansein, Direct Ishq in 2016.

The movie Care of Footpath 2, in which Vivek Kar was a music director, was a lateral entry to Oscars as well.

Films as Music Composer

Songs

References

External links 
 
 Vivek Kar  at Apple Music

Living people
Indian film score composers
Indian pop composers
Jingle composers
Musicians from Mumbai
Year of birth missing (living people)